Byron Edgar Farwell (June 20, 1921 – August 3, 1999) was an American military historian, biographer, and politician. He was the mayor of Hillsboro, Virginia, for three terms, worked for Chrysler, and as an author completed 14 books and numerous articles.

Biography
Farwell was born in Manchester, Iowa on June 20, 1921. He graduated from Ohio State University and the University of Chicago (M.A., 1968). He served in World War II as a captain and later also saw combat in the Korean War. He separated from the military after seven years of active duty.

His wife was named Ruth. The couple had three children As a civilian, he worked from 1954 to 1971 for Chrysler, including many years as director of administration in Geneva. During part of the 1960s he lived in Switzerland and London. He was mayor of Hillsboro, Virginia, for three terms from 1976 to 1982, losing re-election to a fourth term after a 17-17 vote where the winner was picked out of a punch bowl. As mayor of the town, Farwell became known for coming into conflict with the state and federal governments over items such as the census or regulation of the health department. He was paid $50 dollars a year as mayor.

He published articles in publications such as The New York Times, The Washington Post, Harper's Magazine, American Heritage, and Smithsonian Magazine as well as working as a contributing editor to Military History, World War II, and Collier's Encyclopedia. He was a member of both the Royal Geographical Society and the Royal Society of Literature. Farwell was also a trustee of the Oatlands mansion. He died on August 3, 1999, of a heart attack, in a hospital in Loudoun County, Virginia.

Farwell gave his papers to the University of Iowa.

He completed 14 books, including The Man Who Presumed: A Biography of Henry M. Stanley (1957), Burton: A Biography of Sir Richard Francis Burton (1963), The Gurkhas (1984), The Great War in Africa, 1914–1918 (1986), Armies of the Raj: from the Mutiny to Independence, 1858-1947 (1989),The Great Anglo-Boer War (1990), and Over There: The United States in the Great War, 1917-1918 (1999).

Books
Let's Take a Trip in Our Car [children's book] (1954)
Walter P. Chrysler (1957)
The Man Who Presumed: A Biography of Henry M. Stanley (1957)
Burton: A Biography of Sir Richard Francis Burton (1963)
Prisoners of the Mahdi (1967)
Queen Victoria's Little Wars (1972) 
Mr. Kipling's Army (1981)  
The Gurkhas (1984)  
Eminent Victorian Soldiers: Seekers of Glory (1985) 
The Great War in Africa, 1914–1918 (1986)  
Armies of the Raj: from the Mutiny to Independence, 1858-1947 (1989) 
The Great Anglo-Boer War (1990)  
Ball's Bluff: A Small Battle and Its Long Shadow (1990), McLean, Virginia: EPM Publications; .  
Stonewall: A Biography of General Thomas J. Jackson (1992)  
Over There: The United States in the Great War, 1917-1918 (1999)

References

External links
The "Papers of Byron Farwell", at the University of Iowa Libraries

American military historians
1921 births
1999 deaths
Ohio State University alumni
University of Chicago alumni
People from Manchester, Iowa
20th-century American historians
20th-century American male writers
People from Loudoun County, Virginia
Mayors of places in Virginia
American male non-fiction writers
United States Army officers
American biographers
United States Army personnel of World War II
United States Army personnel of the Korean War
Military personnel from Iowa